Bhati  is a clan of Rajputs.

History
The Bhatis reportedly originated in Mathura through a common ancestor named Bhati, who was a descendant of Pradyumn. According to the seventeenth-century Nainsi ri Khyat, the Bhatis after losing Mathura moved to Bhatner in Lakhi Jungle, and from there to other locations in western and northwestern India including Punjab. Jaisalmer had a dynasty with a successful line of rulers and this became their center. Bhatner, Pugal, Bikrampur, Barsalpur, Deravar, Maroth, Kehror, Aasnikot, Tanot, Ludrovo and Mamanvahan were some of the fortified settlements that were historically ruled by the Bhati clan or subclans. The Bhati ruler Vijayrao was known as the 'uttara disi bhad kivaad' (the sentinel of the north direction), due to his control over forts and settlements that extended from Ghazni to Gujarat, leading to several conflicts with the invading Muslim tribes. The Phulkian dynasty claimed descent from Rawal Jaisal, the Bhati Rajput founder of Jaisalmer.

References 

Rajput clans
Surnames